Coccothrinax munizii is a species of palm tree that is endemic to eastern Cuba.  Like other members of the genus Coccothrinax, C. munizii is a fan palm.  It grows on rocky hills or in dry scrub forest on limestone.

Henderson and colleagues (1995) considered C. munizii to be a synonym of Coccothrinax ekmanii.

References

External links

munizii
Trees of Cuba
Plants described in 1972